John Owan Enoh  (born 4 June 1966) is a Nigerian politician, farmer and philanthropist.

Personal life 

Political career 
Enoh was a Senator of the Federal Republic of Nigeria in 2015 representing Central Senatorial District of Cross River State in the 8th Assembly of the Senate.

He was a member of the People's Democratic Party (PDP) up until May 2017 when he decamped to the ruling All progressive Congress (APC) and contested for governorship and lost to incumbent governor Ben Ayade.

Farm venture 
Aside from politics, Enoh own numerous farms where he conducts arable and livestock production. Farming venture he started 2000 has as at 2021 since cultivated about 2000 hectares of cultivated lands. Enoh's farm spreads across various parts of Cross River State. About 150 hectares of planted palms in his native Agbokim Waterfalls; and expanding to about 100 hectares of planted palms, and counting, at Etara-Ekuri. All communities in Etung LGA of Cross River State, where the politician hails.

Enoh is said to operate an out-grower scheme in communities where his farms are located. The out-grower scheme is a corporate social responsibility scheme that empowers local small scale farmers with arable and livestock to grow in their farms and later provides them with the market to sell these products.

Philanthropy 
Aside from politics, Enoh runs a philanthropy including founding a foundation tagged JOE (John Owan Enoh) Foundation where he provides help for people living with diabetes in Nigeria.

(APC)

References

Living people
Peoples Democratic Party members of the Senate (Nigeria)
1966 births
All Progressives Congress politicians
University of Calabar alumni